Broken Wings: The Encore Collection is the first U.S. compilation album of the eighties band Mr. Mister. It contains the billboard hits "Broken Wings", "Kyrie", "Hunters of the Night", "Is It Love" and "Something Real (Inside Me/Inside You)." The album contains all full album versions of the songs except for "Broken Wings", which has its radio edit featured on this album.

Track listing
All songs by Richard Page, Steve George and John Lang except where noted:

 "Is It Love"–3:34
 "Broken Wings" (Radio Edit)–4:39
 "Stand and Deliver"–5:35
 "Hunters of the Night" (Page, George, Lang, George Ghiz)–5:10
 "Welcome to the Real World"–4:19
 "Something Real (Inside Me/Inside You)"–4:20
 "The Border" – 5:40
 "Kyrie"–4:25
 "I Wear the Face"–4:54 (CD Only)
 "Life Goes On"–5:12 (CD Only)

Track Sources
 4, 9, 10 : I Wear the Face (1984)
 1, 2, 5, 8 : Welcome to the Real World (1985)
 3, 6, 7 : Go On... (1987)

Album credits
 Richard Page – bass, double bass, vocals
 Steve Farris – guitars
 Pat Mastelotto – percussion
 Steve George – piano, synthesizer

External links
Amazon.com: Broken Wings: Encore Collection: Mr. Mister: Music

Mr. Mister albums
1999 compilation albums
RCA Records compilation albums